The New Caledonian whistler (Pachycephala caledonica) is a species of bird in the family Pachycephalidae.
It is endemic to New Caledonia.

Taxonomy and systematics
The New Caledonian whistler was originally classified in the genus Muscicapa. It has also been treated as a subspecies of the golden whistler. Until 2014, it was considered conspecific with the Melanesian whistler.

References

New Caledonian whistler
Endemic birds of New Caledonia
New Caledonian whistler
New Caledonian whistler